Argyrophorodes angolensis is a moth in the family Crambidae. It was described by David John Lawrence Agassiz in 2012. It is found in Angola, the Democratic Republic of the Congo and Zambia.

The wingspan is 18–19 mm. The forewings are whitish, with dark fuscous scaling along the costa and a dark fuscous subbasal crossline. The termen is yellow. The hindwings are white with an ochreous base and a blackish subbasal and median line. Adults have been recorded on wing in March and May.

Etymology
The species is named for the country of Angola, where many specimens originate.

References

Acentropinae
Moths described in 2012
Moths of Africa